The Vice-Chief of the Defence Staff (VCDS) is the deputy to the Chief of the Defence Staff, the professional head of the British Armed Forces. The position was titled Deputy Chief of the Defence Staff before 1964.  From 1966 to 1978 the post was occupied by a 3 star officer. From 1978 onwards the post has been held by a 4 star officer.

List of Vice Chiefs of the Defence Staff
These are:

References

Defence Staff
British military appointments